Loch Duntelchaig (from the Scottish Gaelic Loch Dun Seilcheig) is a freshwater loch in the traditional county of Inverness-shire in the Scottish Highlands. The loch drains via Loch a Chlachain into the River Nairn. It is also the main reservoir for Inverness sitting less than a kilometre from the secondary reservoir Loch Ashie.

References 

Duntelchaig, Loch
Duntelchaig